Farther Along is an American novel written by Donald Harington. It was published in 2008.

Plot 
The Bluff Dweller decides to abandon modern living, to vanish from society, so he begins living like a Native-American inside a cave up in the Ozark Mountains. The Bluff Dweller nearly drinks himself to death, but two women save him.

Characters 
 The Bluff Dweller – the protagonist of the novel and only identifier for his name that is given by Harington, former curator of a museum of U.S. historical treasures, who has left his life to live in a stone cave, and to take on the appearance of the people who used to live in such places, "Bluff Dwellers".
 Eliza Cunningham – an attractive historian who wants to study the paramour of a former governor of the state. She is also the love interest of the Bluff Dweller.
 French horn – a mysterious narrator of the novel, may be a woman's monologue.

References

External links 
 Review of Farther Along by Julie Failla Earhart
 Summary of Farther Along by BOOK JACKET

2008 American novels